Charlotte Kelly is a British singer-songwriter, composer, arranger, and record producer. Kelly rose to fame in the mid-1990s as one of the lead singers of British R&B group Soul II Soul, one of the London's best-selling groups of all time. She performed lead vocals on their single "I Care" for their fourth studio album Volume V: Believe (1995). She continued to record and perform with the group until the release of their final studio album Time for Change (1997). During their hiatus, Kelly released her debut solo album Just Another Girl (1998), which sold exclusively in Japan. She released her second album Charlotte (1999), which included number-one dance hit "Skin".

Kelly reunited with the group in 2010 for their Reunion Tour. Following the conclusion of the tour, Kelly continued to perform with the group as the lead singer. In 2013, she left the group to pursue her solo career.

Her work has earned her several awards and nominations, including three United Nations Music Aid Awards, a UK Songwriting Contest Award and Unisong International Song Award. Kelly has also received the Heritage Award from Performing Right Society along with the members of Soul II Soul.

Early life
Charlotte Kelly was born in Coventry, England, to Michelle Kelly and Tony Kelly in either 1976 or 1977. Her parents were the former owners of a record store named "Moonshine" in Lower Ford Street, Hillfields, Coventry. She also has a two sisters and a brother. Kelly was born blind at birth with no sight at all in her left eye and virtually none in her right eye. At a young age, Kelly knew she wanted become a singer after listening to the music being played in her parents' record store.

Career

1992–93: Beginnings
Kelly started her career as a singer at the age of sixteen when she signed her first record contract with Big Life Records. In 1993, Kelly released her first single titled "Sugar Tree". The music video debuted on ITV Chart Show in October 1993. In 1994, she released two singles titled "Climb My Stairs" and "All of Your Love". Later that year, she was introduced to Jazzie B (of Soul II Soul) who would produce her next single titled "Queen of Hearts". The song featured background vocals from Lamya (of Soul II Soul).

1994–1997: Soul II Soul and career breakthrough
After releasing this demo, Kelly toured as a background singer for Soul II Soul. She was later asked to become a full-time member and one of the lead vocalist of the group. In August 1995, Soul II Soul released their fourth studio album, entitled "Volume V: Believe". The album charted at number 13 on the UK Albums chart. The album's second single "I Care", which features lead vocals by Kelly, peaked at number 17 on the UK Singles chart. Kelly also sings lead vocals on songs "Don't You Dream" and "Pride".

In 1997, Soul II Soul released their fifth studio album, entitled "Time for Change". Kelly performed lead vocals on the titled-track "Time for Change". Later that year, Kelly left Soul II Soul pursue her solo career. She signed a new recording contract with Parlophone Rhythm Series.

1998–2000: Just Another Girl and Charlotte
In February 1998, Kelly released the single "Be Mine". The single charted at number 59 on the UK Singles chart.  In November 1998, Charlotte released her first album Just Another Girl exclusive in Japan.

In February 1999, "Skin" was released as the lead single from her upcoming second album. The song peaked at number 1 on Billboard Club Play chart and number 56 on the UK Singles chart, selling over 40,000 copies worldwide. In June 1999, the album's second single "Someday" peaked at number 74 on the UK Singles chart. Kelly's remix project "Remixed to Infinity" was also released exclusively to Japan. The album features a total of eight songs that were remixed from three original songs: "Skin", "Someday", and "Be Mine".

In September 1999, Kelly released her self-titled second studio album "Charlotte". The album's final single "Don't Be Afraid of the Dark" was released in 2000 and peaked at number 11 on Billboard's Dance chart.

2002–2010: Songwriting competitions and music production
In 2002, Kelly released a song "Golden Gate (Lovin' You)", which was featured on the WMC Allstars compilation album. In 2004, Kelly participated in the USA Songwriting Competition. She entered up to four songs and won first prize in the R&B category for her song "Cheeky". In 2006, she participated in UK Songwriting Competition and won first prize in R&B category. She also entered in the Pop category where she received second place. In the same year, Kelly also entered in the Music Aid Awards where she received first place in two categories: "Best UK Female Artist" and "Best UK Songwriter".

In 2010 Charlotte co-wrote the topline to UK number 1 single "Good Times", performed by Roll Deep. This earned Charlotte her first UK number 1.

2010–2013: Return to Soul II Soul
In 2010, the former members of Soul II Soul reunited for a reunion tour. Following the reunion tour, Kelly rejoined the group as the lead vocalist. The group performed the annual Rewind Festival in 2012. In June 2012, the members of Soul II Soul received the honorary PRS Heritage Plaque award. In November 2013, Kelly left the group again to focus on her solo career.

2013–present: Solo career
In 2013, Kelly released a single titled "Somebody's Baby". In 2014, Kelly released three singles: "Tell the Sun", "All Coming Back", and "Sonic Sex".

Personal life
She has two daughters named Iman and India, and a son named Soul. In 2013, Kelly married music producer Benjamin Bennett. In November 2015, the couple separated, and divorced later.

Discography
Albums
 Just Another Girl (1998)
 Remixed to Infinity (1999)
 Charlotte (1999)

Singles

Awards and nominations

USA Songwriting competition

|-
|rowspan="4"|2004
|"Cheeky"
|rowspan="6"|Best R&B Song
|
|-
|"Symphony"
|
|-
|"Raining in Heaven"
|
|-
|"Spook"
|
|-
|rowspan="2"|2005
|"I Need You That Way"
|
|-
|"Come On"
|

UK Songwriting competition

|-
|rowspan="4"|2006
|"I Need You That Way"
|rowspan="2"|Best R&B, Hip-Hop, Rap Song
|
|-
|"Come On"
|
|-
|"Raining in Heaven"
|rowspan="2"|Best Pop Song
|
|-
|"Better With You"
|

United Nations Music Aid Awards

|-
|rowspan="2"|2006
|rowspan="3"|Charlotte Kelly
|Best UK Female Artist
|
|-
|Best UK Songwriter
|
|-
|2009
|Best Female Solo Artist
|

Unisong International Song Contest

|-
|rowspan="2"|2007
|"I Need You That Way"
|rowspan="2"|Best R&B, Hip-Hop, Rap Song
|
|-
|"Symphony"
|

See also
List of number-one dance hits (United States)
List of artists who reached number one on the US Dance chart

References

British house musicians
British dance musicians
Blind musicians
Blind singers
English dance musicians
20th-century Black British women singers
English people of Jamaican descent
Living people
Year of birth missing (living people)
21st-century Black British women singers
Soul II Soul members